On Her Majesty's Secret Service may refer to:

 On Her Majesty's Secret Service (novel), a 1963 novel by Ian Fleming
 On Her Majesty's Secret Service (film), a 1969 film adaptation of the novel
On Her Majesty's Secret Service (soundtrack), the soundtrack from the film, including the title theme